Edmund A. Webster served as the fifth Secretary of State of Alabama from 1834 to 1836.

References

Secretaries of State of Alabama
19th-century American politicians
Year of birth missing
Year of death missing